John Eland (by 1484–1542), of Kingston upon Hull, Yorkshire, was an English politician.

He was a Member (MP) of the Parliament of England for Kingston upon Hull in 1510.

References

15th-century births
1542 deaths
Politicians from Kingston upon Hull
English MPs 1510